The Kilkenny Intermediate Football Championship (also known for sponsorship reasons as the JJ Kavanagh & Sons Kilkenny Intermediate Football Championship) is an annual Gaelic football competition which has been organised by the Kilkenny County Board of the Gaelic Athletic Association since 1990, for the second-tier football teams in County Kilkenny, Ireland.

The series of games are played during the autumn and winter months with the county final played in December. The championship has historically been played on a straight knockout basis whereby once a team loses they are eliminated from the series.

The winning club in the Kilkenny IFC progresses to the Leinster Intermediate Club Football Championship, the winners of which compete for the All-Ireland Intermediate Club Football Championship.

The title has been won at least once by seventeen different clubs. The all-time record-holders are Barrow Rangers, Piltown, Mullinavat, Kilmoganny and Thomastown, who have all won the competition twice. 

Conahy Shamrocks became the 2017 title-holders after defeating Rower-Inistioge 1-08 to 0-08 in the final.

External links
 Kilkenny GAA Bible

Gaelic football competitions in Leinster
Intermediate Gaelic football county championships
Kilkenny GAA club championships
Gaelic football competitions in County Kilkenny
Kilkenny Senior Football Championship